The Korean War Ranger Companies were the United States Army Rangers of the Korean War.

History

At the outbreak of war in Korea, a unique Ranger unit was formed. Headed by Second Lieutenant Ralph Puckett, the Eighth Army Ranger Company was created in August 1950. It would serve as the role model for the rest of the Ranger units to be formed. Instead of being organized into self-contained battalions, the Ranger units of the Korean and Vietnam eras would be organized into companies and then attached to larger units, to serve as organic special operations units.

In addition to the special skills and techniques used by their forebears, the Ranger Infantry Companies added airborne assault to their repertoire. All Rangers within the companies were airborne qualified.

In total, eighteen additional Ranger companies were formed in the next seven months: Eighth Army Raider Company and First through Fifteenth Ranger Infantry Companies (Airborne) and Ranger Infantry Companies A & B.  The Army Chief of Staff assigned the Ranger training program at Fort Benning to Colonel John Gibson Van Houten. The program would eventually be split to include a training program located in Korea. 3rd and 7th Ranger companies were tasked to train new Rangers.

The 28 October 1950 would see the next four Ranger companies formed. Soldiers from the 505th Airborne Infantry Regiment and the 82nd Airborne's 80th Anti-Aircraft Artillery Battalion volunteered and, after initially being designated the 4th Ranger Company, became the 2nd Ranger Company — the only all-black Ranger unit in United States history. After the four companies had begun their training, they were joined by the 5th-8th Ranger companies on 20 November 1950.

During the course of the war, the Rangers patrolled and probed, scouted and destroyed, attacked and ambushed the Communist Chinese and Korean enemy. The 1st Rangers destroyed the 12th North Korean Division headquarters in a daring night raid. The 2nd and 4th Rangers made a combat airborne assault near Munsan where Life Magazine reported that Allied troops were now patrolling north of the 38th Parallel. Crucially, the 2nd Rangers plugged the gap made by the retreating Allied forces, the 5th Rangers helped stop the Chinese 5th Phase Offensive.  To provide manning slots for newly activated Special Forces units, all Ranger companies were inactivated in 1951, beginning with the Eighth Army Ranger Company on 28 March and ending with 6th Ranger Company on  1 December.

Organization

References

United States Army Rangers
Military units and formations established in 1950
United States Army units and formations in the Korean War